Garo Zareh Antreasian (1922 – 2018) was an American printmaker and educator. He was one of the co-founders of the Tamarind Lithography Workshop in Los Angeles, California.

Biography
Antreasian was born on February 16, 1922, in Indianapolis, Indiana, to an Armenian family. His parents had survived the Armenian genocide of 1915. Antreasian attended Arsenal Technical High School, where he was introduced to lithography. He studied at the Herron Art Institute in Indianapolis. He moved to New York in 1948 where he studied at Atelier 17 and the Art Students League of New York.

In 1960 he was one of the founders of the Tamarind Lithography Workshop in Los Angeles, California. There he served as the first technical director and master printer. The Tamarind moved to Albuquerque, New Mexico, where it became known as the Tamarind Institute. In 1964 Antreasian moved to Albuquerque as well, where he taught art at the University of New Mexico (UNM) and retained his relationship with the Tamarind. He was involved with bringing the Tamarind Institute under the auspices of UNM. Antreasian taught at UNM from 1964 to 1987 and eventually became the chairman of the Department of Art and Art History, and then professor emeritus after his retirement.

In 1985 Antreasian received a Fulbright Award to travel to Brazil and lecture in Sáo Paulo and Rio de Janeiro.

Antreasian died on November 3, 2018, in Albuquerque, New Mexico.

Antreasian's work is included in the collections of the Art Institute of Chicago, the Metropolitan Museum of Art, the Museum of Modern Art, the National Gallery of Art, the Smithsonian American Art Museum., and The Hyde Collection.

Bibliography

References

External links 
Images of Antreasian's work from the Smithsonian American Art Museum
Oral history interview with Garo Zareh Antreasian, 1974 March 29 from Archives of American Art, Smithsonian Institution
Garo Antreasian: A print pioneer by David Greenhalgh from Kenneth Tyler Collection

1922 births
2018 deaths
20th-century American artists
American printmakers
Atelier 17 alumni
American people of Armenian descent
Artists from Indianapolis
Herron School of Art and Design alumni